Jóhan Hendrik Weyhe was Lawman of the Faroe Islands from 1679 to 1706.

Jóhan Hendrik Weyhe was Faroese, and the largest land owner in the Faroe Islands. He was also the father-in-law of Lawman Sámal Pætursson Lamhauge, who took over from him in the post.

References

Løgtingið 150 – Hátíðarrit. Tórshavn 2002, Bind 2, S. 366. (Avsnitt Føroya løgmenn fram til 1816) (PDF-Download)

Lawmen of the Faroe Islands
Year of birth unknown
Year of death unknown